Alexander the Great (356 BC – 323 BC) was a king of Macedonia (ancient kingdom).

Alexander the Great may also refer to:

Film
Films based on the life of Alexander the Great:
Alexander the Great (1956 film), an American film
Alexander (2004 film), an American film directed by Oliver Stone
Alexander the Great (2014 film), a German documentary film
In the Footsteps of Alexander the Great, a  BBC documentary television series

Other films:
Alexander the Great (1980 film), a Greek film
Alexander the Great (2010 film), a Malayalam-language film

Music
Alexander the Great (band), a band from the Socialist Republic of Macedonia (now Republic of North Macedonia)
Alexander the Great (Monty Alexander album) (1965)
Alexander the Great (Eric Alexander album) (2000)
"Alexander the Great", a 1986 song by Iron Maiden from Somewhere in Time

Transport
TSS Alexander the Great or TEV Rangatira, a turbo-electric ship
Alexander the Great Airport (Greece) or Kavala International Airport
Alexander the Great Airport (North Macedonia) changed in 2018 to Skopje International Airport

Other uses
Alexander I the Great  or Alexander I of Georgia (1386–1445/6), King of Georgia (1412–1442)
Alexander the Great (board game), a 1971 board game

See also
Alexander (disambiguation)
Alexander the Great in the Quran, Islamic prophet (possible interpretation of Zul Qarnain)
Megas Alexandros, Pella, a former municipality in Greece
Alexander, a lunar impact crater

Human name disambiguation pages